Åke Lundeberg (14 December 1888 – 29 May 1939) was a Swedish sport shooter who won two gold and one silver medals at the 1912 Summer Olympics.

Lundederg was a military officer and a forest manager, who belonged to the State Forestry School in Kloten at the time of 1912 Olympics. He retired early and returned to his home town of Gävle, where he died aged 50.

References

1888 births
1939 deaths
Swedish male sport shooters
Running target shooters
Shooters at the 1912 Summer Olympics
Olympic shooters of Sweden
Olympic gold medalists for Sweden
Olympic silver medalists for Sweden
Olympic medalists in shooting
Medalists at the 1912 Summer Olympics
People from Gävle
Sportspeople from Gävleborg County
20th-century Swedish people